The 1981 The Citadel Bulldogs football team represented The Citadel, The Military College of South Carolina in the 1981 NCAA Division I-A football season.  Art Baker served as head coach for the fourth season.  The Bulldogs played as members of the Southern Conference and played home games at Johnson Hagood Stadium.

Schedule

NFL Draft selections

References

Citadel Bulldogs
The Citadel Bulldogs football seasons
Citadel football